Desperate Journey is a 1942 American World War II action and aviation film directed by Raoul Walsh and starring Errol Flynn and Ronald Reagan. The supporting cast includes Raymond Massey, Alan Hale Sr., and Arthur Kennedy. The melodramatic film featured a group of downed Allied airmen making their way out of the Third Reich, often with their fists.

Director Raoul Walsh called it "a war comedy spiced with enough tragedy to give it reality... beyond doubt the forerunner for Hogan's Heroes."

Plot
Assigned to bomb a critical German railway junction at Schneidemühl, Flight Lt. Terrence Forbes presses home an attack at low altitude, and his bomber is shot down near the former Polish border. The five survivors—Forbes, American Flying Officer Johnny Hammond, Flight Sgt. Kirk Edwards, Flying Officer Jed Forrest, and the injured Flight Sgt. Lloyd Hollis—are quickly captured by the Germans.

Interviewed by Major Otto Baumeister, Hammond creates a distraction by pretending to explain their bomber's technology in technobabble double-talk; then he suddenly knocks the major unconscious. Forbes then subdues the other soldiers and the group searches the major's office. They find papers showing a hidden Messerschmitt aircraft factory, and determine to get them to England. Setting out on their dangerous trip across enemy territory, they attack a patrol to obtain German uniforms, then sneak onto a hospital train heading for Berlin. Conveniently, Reichsmarschall Göring's private car is in the train, being transported for maintenance; they hide in the empty car, helping themselves to luxuries. Just before reaching Berlin, they are found in the car and thrown off the train; but this enables them to avoid Baumeister, who has traveled by air to overtake it.

They hide in an abandoned Berlin building, but while scouting for food, they see an important chemical plant and decide to sabotage it so they will do some damage to the enemy even if they cannot get the documents to England. As they are getting away, there is a gun battle and Hollis is wounded again. They happen on a member of the underground, Kaethe Brahms, who takes them to a doctor, but Hollis dies. Brahms advises the crew to cross the country to Münster, where her parents are also resistance members and can help them escape Germany.

With Baumeister on their trail, the men reach the Brahms house, but it is a trap: Kaethe's parents have been captured and Gestapo members are impersonating them. When Kaethe arrives, the ruse is exposed. The crew members manage to escape over the roofs, but Edwards is shot and falls to his death. Kaethe rejects an offer to accompany the men to England; the underground has more work to do. The others steal Baumeister's car and cross into the German-occupied Netherlands as he pursues in another car.

Finally they run out of petrol, but when they see a petrol tanker stop nearby, they find a captured British Hudson bomber, concealed there, that is being prepared for an attack on England. They overpower the flight crew and steal it, but Forrest is shot. They use the airplane's guns to blast their way past the soldiers on the ground, killing many of them, including Baumeister. After takeoff, on their way to the English Channel, Hammond releases the bomb aboard, destroying a German base. As they reach safety, Forbes and Hammond learn that Forrest will recover from his wounds.

Cast

 Errol Flynn as Flight Lt. Terrence Forbes
 Ronald Reagan as Flying Officer Johnny Hammond
 Nancy Coleman as Kaethe Brahms
 Raymond Massey as Major Otto Baumeister
 Alan Hale Sr. as Flight Sgt. Kirk Edwards
 Arthur Kennedy as Flying Officer Jed Forrest
 Ronald Sinclair as Flight Sgt. Lloyd Hollis II
 Albert Bassermann as Dr. Mather
 Sig Ruman as Preuss
 Patrick O'Moore as Squadron Leader Lane-Ferris
 Felix Basch as Hermann Brahms
 Ilka Grüning as Frau Brahms
 Elsa Bassermann as Frau Raeder
 Charles Irwin as Captain Coswick
 Richard Fraser as Squadron Leader Clark
 Robert O. Davis as Kruse
 Henry Victor as Heinrich Schwarzmueller
 Bruce Lester as English Officer
 Lester Matthews as Wing Commander
 Ludwig Hardt as Pharmacist (uncredited)

Production
The film was originally known as Forced Landing. It was written by Arthur Horman, who had done some uncredited work on the script for 49th Parallel (1941), notably scenes with Raymond Massey and Laurence Olivier. While there he came up with the idea for a film about six English pilots escaping through occupied Europe, the reverse situation of 49th Parallel.

Vincent Sherman was considered to direct; he wrote to Hal Wallis saying he loved the central concept and thought the basic idea was good but "its greatest weakness was it didn't have a story...once the men make their first escape you could very easily leave out every following sequence and simply go to the end without losing anything in so far as story is concerned".

Sherman was replaced as director by Raoul Walsh and the title changed to Desperate Journey. Errol Flynn was meant to make Gentleman Jim for the studio but they postponed it so he could star in Desperate Journey instead. The movie was rushed into production in order to take advantage of America's recent entry into the war, which meant the problems in the script identified by Sherman were never really fixed.

Prior to and during filming, uncredited work on the script was done by Julius and Philip Epstein. Director Raoul Walsh said "they have added a little zip to the script" and asked for them to keep working on it from a memo from Raoul Walsh to Hal Wallis dated February 13, 1942.

Principal photography on Desperate Journey took place from late January-early April 1942, filmed at the Warner Bros. studio, Lake Sherwood (Point Mugu and Point Hueneme) and Warner Ranch, Calabasas, California backlots. Flying scenes were shot at the Van Nuys Metropolitan Airport. Warner Bros. was located in close proximity to the Lockheed aircraft plant, and was able to "borrow" a production Lockheed Hudson bomber for the film that was already destined for RAF use. The other aircraft that is featured prominently in the film, mainly through a mock-up (shot on Warner's Sound Stage 16) and in model work, is the contemporary United States and RAF Boeing B-17 Flying Fortress bomber.

Ronald Reagan, an air force reservist before World War II, received his call for active service while the film was in production. While Warners lobbied the government for a 30-day extension, the US Army was only willing to offer two weeks, forcing Walsh to shoot scenes with Reagan out of sequence, and to use a double for some scenes.

After beginning his film career, Reagan called himself the "B movie Errol Flynn", but in Desperate Journey, he shared top billing with Flynn. He made the most out of the film's showcase scene, his fast-paced doubletalk in the interrogation by Massey. Flynn also lobbied intensely to get the scene but despite a closed-door shouting match with director Walsh, the producer insisted that no changes to the script would be accepted.

Fresh from his acclaimed effort in Kings Row (1942), Reagan was at the high point of his career, making the transition from supporting to lead actor in studio features, and about to sign a seven-year contract with Warner Bros. In post-war years, Reagan's Hollywood career would never regain the same momentum before he was called up for duty.

During production, Flynn's February 1942 draft board physical revealed the presence of tuberculosis in his right lung. Unwilling to face an extended unpaid layoff, Flynn hid his condition from Warners. Between his illness and Walsh's exacting schedule, as the shoot progressed, Flynn dropped to 165 pounds. His wardrobe first was refitted, and then ultimately padded. Due to illness, Flynn was often late.

Reception
The film had its world premiere in Libertyville, Illinois, in a special screening to raise money for war bonds.

Box office
Desperate Journey went on to gross $2 million for Warners Bros., the third Flynn film of that year to reach that coveted mark, according to Variety. Studio bosses were aware the film was being screened during Flynn's rape trial, yet the negative publicity actually enhanced ticket sales.

According to Warner Bros records, the film earned $2,029,000 domestically and $1,951,000 foreign.

Critical reaction
Despite its popularity at the box office, critical reviews were not positive. Bosley Crowther of The New York Times characterized the plot as basically similar to other, much better recent films, Target for Tonight (1941)  and Man Hunt (1941). His review centered on the frenzy of the action. "And such hair-raising, side-splitting adventures as they have in a wild-goose trek across Germany — such slugging of guards and Raymond Massey, such chases and incidental sabotage you'll not see this side of the comics, or possibly an old-time Western film."

Filmink magazine said that "It’s all done very much in Biggles mode, making the war seem like a game (several of the crew die, but it’s similar to losing points in a video game)."

Awards
Desperate Journey was nominated for the Oscar for Best Special Effects (Byron Haskin and Nathan Levinson) at the 15th Academy Awards.

Home media
Desperate Journey was released on VHS Home Video in 1994. In the USA, the film is issued as part of the TCM Spotlight: Errol Flynn Adventures Collection, Volume 2 (2010). In 2020, a new, separate DVD release was done under the Warner Bros. Archive Collection series.

See also
 Ronald Reagan films
 List of American films of 1942

References

Notes

Citations

Bibliography

 Aylesworth, Thomas G. The Best of Warner Bros. London: Bison Books, 1986. . 
 Beck, Simon D. The Aircraft-Spotter's Film and Television Companion. Jefferson, North Carolina: McFarland and Company, 2016. .
 Behlmer, Rudy. Inside Warner Brothers, 1935-51.  London: Weidenfeld & Nicolson, 1987. .
 Maltin, Leonard. Leonard Maltin's Movie Encyclopedia. New York: Dutton, 1994. .
 McClelland, Doug. The Golden Age of B Movies. New York: Bonanza Publishing, 1978. .
 Orriss, Bruce. When Hollywood Ruled the Skies: The Aviation Film Classics of World War II. Hawthorne, California: Aero Associates Inc., 1984. .
 Reagan, Ronald. An American Life: The Autobiography. New York: Simon & Schuster, 1990. .
 Thomas, Tony, Rudy Behlmer and Clifford McCarty. The Films of Errol Flynn. New York: Citadel Press, 1969. .
 Wynne, H. Hugh. The Motion Picture Stunt Pilots and Hollywood's Classic Aviation Movies. Missoula, Montana: Pictorial Histories Publishing Co., 1987. .

External links

 
 Desperate Journey at Turner Classic Movies 
 
 
 Review at Variety

1942 films
American war drama films
1940s war drama films
American aviation films
American black-and-white films
1940s English-language films
Films scored by Max Steiner
Films about Nazi Germany
Films about shot-down aviators
Films directed by Raoul Walsh
Films produced by Hal B. Wallis
Films set in England
Films set in Germany
Warner Bros. films
World War II aviation films
World War II films made in wartime
1942 drama films